Be Free may refer to:


Music
Be Free (festival), Belarusian rock festival

Songs
"Be Free" (song), a 2005 song by Belinda Peregrín
"Be Free", a song by Aero Chord and electronic trio Klaypex (2015)
"Be Free", a song by Elán from album London Express (2005)
"Be Free", a song by Greeeen from Ā, Domo. Ohisashiburi Desu. (2008)
"Be Free", a song by J. Cole recorded during the 2014 Forest Hills Drive era (2014)
"Be Free", a song by TRF (1998)
"Be Free", a song by Ten City (2021)

Other
Be-Free, a Bahraini non-profit a program concerned with the protection of children and teenagers
beFree, Inc., online advertising company now part of CJ Affiliate
"Be Free", an episode from the sixth season of Orange Is the New Black (2018)